John Henry Hubbard (March 24, 1804 in Salisbury, Connecticut – July 30, 1872 in Litchfield, Connecticut) was a Republican member of the United States House of Representatives from Connecticut's 4th congressional district from 1863 to 1867. He also served as a member of the Connecticut Senate from 1847 to 1849.

Early life 
He was born in Salisbury, Connecticut and attended the public schools. He studied law. He was admitted to the bar in 1828 and commenced practice in Lakeville.

He served as a member of the State Senate 1847-1849.

He served as prosecuting attorney 1849-1852. He moved to Litchfield in 1855 and continued the practice of law.

Hubbard was elected to the Thirty-eighth and Thirty-ninth Congresses (March 4, 1863 – March 3, 1867). He was an unsuccessful candidate for renomination in 1866. He resumed the practice of law.

He died in Litchfield, Connecticut, on July 30, 1872.
He was interred in the East Cemetery.

References

External links 
 
 

1804 births
1872 deaths
Connecticut lawyers
Republican Party Connecticut state senators
People from Salisbury, Connecticut
Politicians from Litchfield, Connecticut
Republican Party members of the United States House of Representatives from Connecticut
19th-century American politicians
19th-century American lawyers